Al-Ikhlāṣ ("Sincerity"), also known as the Declaration of God's Unity and al-Tawhid ("Monotheism"), is the 112th chapter (sūrah) of the Quran.

According to George Sale, this chapter is held in particular veneration by Muslims, and declared, by Islamic tradition, to be equal in value to a third part of the whole Quran . It is said to have been revealed during the Quraysh Conflict with Muhammad in answer to a challenge over the distinguishing attributes of God, Muhammad invited them to worship.

Al-Ikhlas is not merely the name of this surah but also the title of its contents, for it deals exclusively with Tawhid. The other surahs of the Quran generally have been designated after a word occurring in them, but in this surah the word Ikhlas has occurred nowhere. It has been given this name in view of its meaning and subject matter.

Summary
 	1-4  The unity of God declared

Text and meaning

Text and transliteration
Hafs from Aasim ibn Abi al-Najud

¹ 

² 

³ 

⁴ 

Warsh from Nafi‘ al-Madani

¹ 

² 

³ 

⁴

Translations

Say, "He is Allah, [who is] One,

Allah, the Eternal Refuge.

He neither begets nor is born,

Nor is there to Him any equivalent."

Say: He is Allah, the One and Only;

Allah, the Eternal, Absolute;

He begetteth not, nor is He begotten;

And there is none like unto Him.

Say: He is Allah, the One!

Allah, the eternally Besought of all!

He begetteth not nor was begotten.

And there is none comparable unto Him.

Meaning

Exegesis

In the early years of Islam, some surahs of the Quran came to be known by several different names, sometimes varying by region. This surah was among those to receive many different titles. It is a short declaration of tawhid, Allah's absolute oneness, consisting of four ayat. Al-Ikhlas means "the purity" or "the refining".

It is disputed whether this is a Meccan or Medinan sura. The former seems more probable, particularly since it seems to have been alluded to by Bilal of Abyssinia, who, when he was being tortured by his cruel master, is said to have repeated "Ahad, Ahad!" (unique, referring as here to God). It is reported from Ubayy ibn Ka'b that it was revealed after the polytheists asked "O Muhammad! Tell us the lineage of your Lord."

Q112:1-2 none comparable to God
Surah Al-Ikhlas contains four verses:
112:1. Say: He is Allah, One. 112:2. Allah As-Samad. 112:3.  He begets not, nor was He begotten.  112:4.  And there is none comparable to Him.

About this, Tafsir Ibn Kathir says: 

The word (Al-Ahad) cannot be used for anyone in affirmation except for Allah within the Islamic Tradition.

Hadith
According to hadiths, this surah is an especially important and honored part of the Quran:
 Narrated Abu Said Al-Khudri: A man heard another man reciting (in the prayers): 'Say (O Muhammad): "He is Allah, the One." (112.1) And he recited it repeatedly. When it was morning, he went to the Prophet and informed him about that as if he considered that the recitation of that Sura by itself was not enough. Allah's Apostle said, "By Him in Whose Hand my life is, it is equal to one-third of the Quran."
 Narrated Yahya related to me from Malik from Ibn Shihab that Humayd ibn Abd ar-Rahman ibn Awf had told him that Surat al-Ikhlas (Surah 112) was equal to a third of the Qur'an, and that Surat al-Mulk (Surah 67) pleaded for its owner.
 Narrated 'Aisha: The Prophet sent (an army unit) under the command of a man who used to lead his companions in the prayers and would finish his recitation with (the Sura 112): 'Say (O Muhammad): "He is Allah, the One." ' (112.1) When they returned (from the battle), they mentioned that to the Prophet. He said (to them), "Ask him why he does so." They asked him and he said, "I do so because it mentions the qualities of the Beneficent and I love to recite it (in my prayer)." The Prophet; said (to them), "Tell him that Allah loves him"
 Imam Malik ibn Anas recorded from Ubayd bin Hunayn that he heard Abu Hurayrah saying, "I went out with the Prophet and he heard a man reciting `Say: He is Allah, the One.' So the Messenger of Allah said, (It is obligatory). I asked, `What is obligatory'  He replied, "Paradise."
 Narrated by Abu Said, the Prophet said to his companions, "Is it difficult for any of you to recite one third of the Qur'an in one night?" This suggestion was difficult for them so they said, "Who among us has the power to do so, O Allah's Apostle?" Allah Apostle replied: " Allah (the) One, the Self-Sufficient Master Whom all creatures need.' (Surat Al-Ikhlas 112.1 ..to the End) is equal to one third of the Qur'an."
 Al-Bukhari reported from Amrah bint Abdur-Rahman, who used to stay in the apartment of Aisha, the wife of the Prophet, that Aisha said, "The Prophet sent a man as the commander of a war expedition and he used to lead his companions in prayer with recitation (of the Quran). And he would complete his recitation with the recitation of `Say: He is Allah, One.' So when they returned they mentioned that to the Prophet and he said, Ask him why does he do that?  So they asked him and he said,  "Because it is the description of Ar-Rahman and I love to recite it.  So the Prophet said,  "Inform him that Allah the Most High loves him." This is how Al-Bukhari recorded this hadith in his book of tawhid. Muslim and an-Nisai also recorded it.
 An authentic Hadith says 'Say [recite] Surat al-Ikhlās and al-Muawwidhatayn (Surat al-Falaq and Surat an-Nās) three times in the morning and the evening; they will suffice you from everything.' [Narrated by At-Tirmidhi. And Muhammad Nasiruddin al-Albani authenticated it: 2829
 Narrated Aisha: "Whenever the Prophet went to bed every night, he used to cup his hands together and blow over it after reciting Surah al-Ikhlas, Surah al-Falaq and Surah an-Nas, and then rub his hands over whatever parts of his body he was able to rub, starting with his head, face and front of his body. He used to do that three times.
 Imam Ahmad also recorded that Ibn 'Umar said, "I watched the Prophet twenty-four or twenty-five times reciting in the two Rak'ahs before the Morning prayer and the two Rak'ahs after the Sunset prayer, 'Say: "O ye infidels!"' (Surah Al-Kafirun) and "Say: "He is Allah, One."

See also
 Al-Falaq
 Al-Nas
 Al-Mu'awwidhatayn

References

External links
Quran 112  Clear Quran translation
 
 The Holy Qur'an, translated by Abdullah Yusuf Ali
 Three translations at Project Gutenberg
 

Chapters in the Quran